Aqa Mahalleh (also Romanized as Āqā Maḩalleh) is a village in Jirdeh Rural District, in the Central District of Shaft County, Gilan Province, Iran. At the 2006 census, its population was 74, in 18 families.

References 

Populated places in Shaft County